Hirschdale is an unincorporated community in Nevada County, California. It lies at an elevation of 5446 feet (1660 m).

References

Unincorporated communities in California
Unincorporated communities in Nevada County, California